The 2010 Israeli Basketball League Cup was the 5th edition of the Israeli Basketball League Cup pre-season tournament. It was played between October 10 and October 14 at Malha Arena in Jerusalem. Maccabi Tel Aviv has won the cup after beating Hapoel Jerusalem 87-77 in the final. MVP was Jeremy Pargo (Maccabi Tel Aviv).

Tournament Bracket
The teams were seeded according to their last season standings.

External links
 Winner Cup

2010
2010–11 in Israeli basketball